Selvam is a 2011 Sri Lankan Sinhala war drama film directed by Sanjaya Leelaratne and produced by M. Mohamed. It stars two debutants Santhalingam Gokularaj and Shalani Tharaka in lead roles along with Malini Fonseka and Joe Abeywickrama. Music composed by Rohana Weerasinghe. The main protagonist Pushparaja is played by Santhalingam Gokularaj, an ex-LTTE soldier. The director cast him after seeing him in a rehabilitation camp after the end of war. It is the 1166th film in the Sri Lankan cinema.

Plot

Cast
 Denny Abinesh as Selvam
 Santhalingam Gokularaj as Pushparaja
 Shalani Tharaka as Medhavi
 Malini Fonseka as Madhuvani
 Joe Abeywickrama as Sathyawel
 Chandika Nanayakkara as Captain Migara
 Lakshman Mendis as Mathara Mudalali
 Jayani Senanayake as Vijitha, Mudalali's wife
 Sanjaya Leelaratne as Bhathiya
 Nadaraja Sivam
 Anuruddhika Dilrukshi
 N. Puvanalogany
 Sasindi Nawanga Hewapatha
Bithum Chabee Chanakya
 Prabath Maduranga Jayawardhana ( Child actor)

Soundtrack

Awards
 2011 Kuala Lumpur Film Festival Award for the Best Asian film of the year 2011
 2011 Kuala Lumpur Film Festival Award for the Best Upcoming Director

References

2011 films
2010s Sinhala-language films
Films about the Sri Lankan Civil War